Shudek (Şudek) is a rural locality (a selo) and the administrative centre of Shudeksky Selsoviet, Yanaulsky District, Bashkortostan, Russia. The population was 525 as of 2010. There are 8 streets.

Geography 
Shudek is located 6 km southwest of Yanaul (the district's administrative centre) by road. Yanaul is the nearest rural locality.

References 

Rural localities in Yanaulsky District